Xu Zidong (born 21 August 1954) is a Chinese literary historian, critic and academic. He is a Professor Emeritus of Chinese at Lingnan University and chair of Chinese department from 2008 to mid 2010s. He is visiting professor at University of Hong Kong as of the 2021–22 academic year. He has written extensively on 20th-century Chinese literature, Hong Kong Literature, cultural studies, and Cultural Revolution literature studies.

He specialises in the works of Yu Dafu, Eileen Chang, and Wang Anyi

He is a vice president of Chinese Association of Literary and Art Theory and member of Shanghai Writers' Association.

Life and career
Born in Shanghai to a middle-class family where his father is a surgeon and mother's family runs a brewery business, Xu has 3 elder half-brothers and his father changed surname to Fan (范) as a foster child but younger generation kept the old family name. As a child, Xu lived in Chonghua New Village, on western Nanjing Road, in Shanghai's main business and shopping district. During the Cultural Revolution Xu first was sent to family hometown of Tiantai in Zhejiang Province but later went to Guangchang, Jiangxi, where he would rose to deputy leader of his production team. In 1973, Xu first partook in Gaokao, registering for faculty of Biology at Shanghai Normal College, only to be upset by Zhang Tiesheng's decision to submit a blank answer sheet for his Physics and Chemistry exam.    Xu later returned to Shanghai to become a steel rolling worker before enrolling as a Master's student in East China Normal University under Qian Gurong, having studied in a 527 University and allegedly finished the undergraduate course in Chinese Literature in 3 months, having started as a physics student. He wrote a course essay on Yu Dafu on the second week of the study, which was then published in the University's Gazette. The work was later expanded into a monograph as New Opinion on Yu Dafu, which cemented his status as an academic.

After graduation, he taught at East China Normal and Fudan Universities. At age of 29 he was promoted to associate professorship at East China Normal, the youngest in Shanghai alongside Wang Huning, who taught politics at Fudan at the time.

Xu moved to Hong Kong briefly with a fellowship, where he met Lee Ou-fan, who would later recommend him to study in the United States. 

Xu studied in LA but moved back to Hong Kong before completing his PhD studies as a vacancy had arisen in the Chinese Department in Lingnan. He finished his doctoral studies at the University of Hong Kong under Lee Ou-fan. He later succeeded Lau Shiu-ming as the Head of Chinese at Lingnan  in 2008; he stepped down as departmental head in 2014.

In 2020, Xu returned to East China Normal as an honorary lecturer., In 2021, Xu returned to the University of Hong Kong as a guest lecturer on 20th Century Chinese literature. As of 2021, Xu retired from Lingnan. 

Xu is also a frequent public lecturer on TV, radio, and podcasts.

TV Personality

First invited by Cao Jingxing to Behind Headlines with Wen Tao in 1998, Xu turned down the offer for fear it would take up too much research time. He was soon advised by his wife, former Shanghai TV hostess Chen Yanhua to conduct deeper research before making a decision. Xu was invited again by Leung Man-tao in 2000 to 'answer a few research questions'. As of 2017, when the show ceased production, he appeared on the show 1313 times, more than any other guests. Xu, Leung, and the host Dou Wentao were named the show's 'Iron Triangle'.

Filmography

Film

TV

References 

People's Republic of China essayists
Writers from Shanghai
People from Shanghai
East China Normal University alumni
University of California, Los Angeles alumni
Alumni of the University of Hong Kong
1954 births

Living people